Luo Dexiu or Lo Te-Hsiu is a Taiwanese martial artist who specializes in the internal Chinese styles of Xingyiquan, Baguazhang, and Taijiquan.

He was born in 1956 (25th day, 11th month of the lunar calendar, which he follows for his birthdate) in Taipei, Taiwan.

Luo Dexiu entered the Tang Shou Tao (唐手道) school of Hong Yixiang (洪懿祥) in 1971, where he began his study of the Internal Martial Arts, devoting himself in the beginning to the use of these arts for fighting, with particular emphasis on Xingyiquan. He became one of Hong Yixiang's best fighters (Pa Kua Chang Journal, 1993).

He later became deeply interested in Baguazhang, which was at the core of the skills taught by Hong Yixiang, having been passed directly from Zhang Junfeng (張俊峰), who trained under Gao Yisheng (高義盛), a master in the Cheng Tinghua (程廷華) branch of Baguazhang. Zhang Junfeng had brought the Gao style of Baguazhang to Taiwan. This lineage and school is called Yizong. Luo Dexiu studied Gao style Baguazhang with Hong Yixiang, and with many of Zhang's other students as well, including Hong Yixiang's brothers Hong Yiwen (洪懿文) and Hong Yimian (洪懿棉). He later continued his intensive studies of Baguazhang with Liu Qian, an early student of Sun Xikun.

Luo Dexiu currently teaches Gao style Baguazhang and Hebei Xingyiquan, carrying on the Yizong tradition through his classes in Taipei, Taiwan, and holds seminar tours annually throughout Europe, America, and the Middle East.

References
 BBC documentary "The Way of the Warrior," Episode 2, "T'ai Chi, 'The Soft Way'" (1983): 
 Esoteric Warriors Kozma, Alex Publisher: Paul H. Crompton (1999) 
 Nei Jia Quan: Internal Martial Arts Teachers of Tai Ji Quan, Xing Yi Quan, and Ba Gua Zhang Jess O'Brien (Editor) North Atlantic Books (2004) 
 Pa Kua Chang Journal (July/August,1993). Lo Te-Hsiu: Carrying on the tradition of Chang Chun-Feng's pa kua chang. 3(5), 22-30.

External links
 Master Luo's own website (in Chinese, English and French)
 Videos with Master Luo:  Clever hands Gao Style Baguazhang
 Area seminar schedules: Albany, CA, USA  London, England
  Boston bagua Seminar Blog
 
 
 / Hervé Marigliano Bretagne France
 Yi Zong Bagua Men 
 Boulder, Colorado Affiliate Yi Zong School
 Zhen Wu Men U.K. Affiliate Yi Zong School
 Zong Wu Men, George Wood's school
 Yizong Long De Guan, Oliver Smith's school, Bristol and Bath, England
 Site of Tim Cartmell
 Yizongbagua Nîmes, France
 , Ed Hines, France
 , William Tucker, Edmonton Canada
 , Nick Cumber, Kent U.K.
 , Dave Bolton, Manchester U.K.
 , Robert Levin, Pennsylvania, U.S.A.

1956 births
Living people
Chinese baguazhang practitioners
Chinese xingyiquan practitioners
Martial arts school founders
Sportspeople from Taipei
Taiwanese martial artists